Luis Jorge Landin (May 26, 1930 – August 26, 2010), was an American Korean War and Vietnam War veteran who has received numerous decorations for his bravery in both wars. Landin completed three tours of combat duty while in Vietnam and is known as Laredo's most decorated war hero.

Military enlistment
Landin enlisted in the U.S. Army in 1948, where he was a combat infantryman. Within a couple of years into his enlistment, he began his first tour of duty in Korea in late 1951.

Service in Vietnam
Landin would become one of the first U.S advisers to the Vietnamese Army Ranger Units in alliance with American Special Forces in 1960. While helping the Vietnamese Army Ranger Units he would be wounded numerous times, for which he would receive three Gallantry crosses. Within a year of becoming an adviser in the Vietnamese Army Rangers Unit, Landin started his first of three volunteer tours in Vietnam in 1961. His first tour was primarily to teach the Vietnamese Army about weapons and different guerrilla war tactics commonly used during the war. While in his first tour he became extremely familiar with the topography in the Danang area as well as the Mekong Delta.

Vietnam tours
In 1964, Landin would begin his second tour of duty in Vietnam that would last all the way through 1966, mostly in charge of the light weapons infantry as an adviser to the Vietnamese Army. Luis would be awarded a Silver Star for his bravery by General William Westmoreland during a Viet Cong ambush. After the assault failed, Landin managed to gather and reorganize his troops and led the men into a counterattack. During the counterattack, Landin was able to save soldiers by carrying them across the battlefield which was under heavy sniper fire to a safe location where they could wait for a medical evacuation aircraft.

In 1968–69 he completed his third tour in Vietnam where he was ranked as a Sergeant Major for the 16th Infantry division. After his third and final tour in Vietnam, Sergeant Major Landin retired in 1973.

References
 http://www.somosprimos.com/sp2002/spdec02.htm
 http://www.hillsidefuneral.com/home/index.cfm/obituaries/view/fh_id/12593/id/693881

1930 births
2010 deaths
People from Laredo, Texas
Military personnel from Texas